The Fall of an Empire is the second album by Fairyland, released on November 27, 2006 by Napalm.

Track listing 
All music, lyrics, vocal lines and concept by Philippe Giordana

 "Endgame" - 1:16
 "The Fall of an Empire" - 5:55
 "Lost in the Dark Lands" - 6:01
 "Slaves Forlorn" - 1:11
 "The Awakening" - 4:50
 "Eldanie Uelle" - 5:21
 "Clanner of the Light" - 6:07
 "To the Havenrod" - 1:05
 "The Walls of Laemnil" - 5:57
 "Anmorkenta" - 6:01
 "In Duna" - 5:02
 "The Story Remains" - 10:38
 "Look into Lost Years" - 3:14
 "Across the Endless Sea" (Japanese bonus track) - 5:31

Credits 
 Anthony Parker - Guitars
 Philippe Giordana - Keyboards, backing vocals
 Thomas Caesar - Guitars, bass
 Pierre-Emmanuel Desfray - Drums
 Maxime Leclercq - Vocals

Fairyland (band) albums
2006 albums
Napalm Records albums
Concept albums